George Francis Stephens (1859–1935), known as Frank Stephens, was an American sculptor, political activist and co-founder of a utopian single-tax community in Arden, Delaware.

Early life, education and family
Stephens was born December 28, 1859, in Rahway, New Jersey, to Henry Louis Stephens and Charlotte Ann Wevil. He briefly attended Rutgers College in New Brunswick, New Jersey, and entered the Pennsylvania Academy of the Fine Arts (PAFA) in 1875,
where he studied under Thomas Eakins at various times between 1879 and 1885. He served as Eakins' teaching assistant beginning in 1880, and married Eakins' sister Caroline "Caddie" Eakins on June 14, 1884.  They had three children, Margaret, Donald, and Roger.  Caroline died after giving birth in 1889. Stephens' second marriage was to Elenor Getty on November 29, 1905; they had 10 children.

Art career
Following art school, Stephens formed a Philadelphia decorative arts business with classmates Colin Campbell Cooper, Jr., Jesse Godley, and Walter J. Cunningham. He worked for several years on the sculpture of Philadelphia City Hall, and was an instructor in modeling at several art schools, including the Drexel Institute. He was a member of the Philadelphia Sketch Club from 1881 until his death in 1935.

Accusations against Eakins
On February 9, 1886, Stephens accused brother-in-law Thomas Eakins of sexual misconduct with his PAFA students and with his deceased sister Margaret.  The charges ignited such a controversy that Eakins was forced to resign from PAFA.

Stephens, his cousin Charles Stephens, and Thomas Anshutz, all PAFA instructors, next took their accusations to the Philadelphia Sketch Club: "We hereby charge Mr. Thoms Eakins with conduct unworthy of a gentleman & discreditable to this organization & ask his expulsion from the club." A committee investigated, concluding that: "Eakins has used his position as an artist and his authority as a teacher to commit certain trespasses on common decency and good morals." His honorary membership in the club was revoked.

The charges of sexual misconduct and incest were unproven, but Eakins's personal reputation was ruined, something from which he never totally recovered.

Single-tax movement
Stephens was influenced by the theories of Henry George, who argued in his 1879 publication Progress and Poverty for a more equitable distribution of wealth, through a single tax levied on the actual value of land irrespective of improvements a person might make. George platformed on this philosophy in his 1886 New York City mayoral bid, and despite losing was successful enough for a subsequent run. Stephens joined his campaign in 1895.

Stephens first came to Delaware along with Will Price, a Philadelphia architect, in 1895-1896 during the single-tax campaign to win political control of the state. The single-taxers hoped that by gaining control of a small political entity they could put their principles into action and prove the legitimacy of Henry George's aims. Although the campaign failed — many activists (including Stephens) were jailed — but Price and Stephens did not give up their dream of creating a utopian community.

Founding Arden, Delaware
With the financial help of Joseph Fels, a wealthy soap manufacturer and single-tax proponent, Stephens purchased the Derrickson property, a  farm six miles north of Wilmington on June 12, 1900. Price and Stephens named their newly founded community after the idyllic Forest of Arden from Shakespeare's As You Like It, and adopted "You are welcome hither" (a line from King Lear) as the community motto because they wanted the village to be a place open to people of all economic levels and political views.

Along with their economic philosophy, Price and Stephens shared a belief in the principles of William Morris, John Ruskin, and the Arts and Crafts Movement. Morris, an Englishman, rebelled against modern cities and industry, advocating a return to craft production, good design, and village life. Price designed a town plan that provided communal open space, encouraged people to mingle with their neighbors, and preserved the woodlands along Naaman's Creek.

Stephens continued to live and lead in Arden for three decades after its founding, earning the nickname "Patro" (a word meaning "Father" in Esperanto) by the villagers. He died June 16, 1935 at age 75 in Gilpin Point, Maryland (another Georgian community he had helped start).

References

Sculptors from Pennsylvania
Pennsylvania Academy of the Fine Arts alumni
Pennsylvania Academy of the Fine Arts faculty
Students of Thomas Eakins
Georgists
1859 births
1935 deaths
People from Rahway, New Jersey
Sculptors from New Jersey
20th-century American sculptors
20th-century male artists
19th-century American sculptors
19th-century male artists
American male sculptors